The USCGC Wyaconda is a Gasconade–class  river buoy tender that was commissioned 30 May 1965 at Leavenworth, Kansas. Wyaconda was the first of four Gasconade–class buoy tenders built by Maxon Construction Co. of Tell City, Indiana. She has been homeported at Dubuque, Iowa since June 1973. Her areas of responsibility are the upper Mississippi River from Clinton, Iowa to Minneapolis, Minnesota; Minnesota River from St. Paul, Minnesota to Shakopee, Minnesota; and St. Croix River from Prescott, Wisconsin to Stillwater, Minnesota.

Citations

Bibliography

  World navies of Today specifications for Gasconade class tug-type river buoy tenders
 Monitoring Times online magazine
 
 

Gasconade-class buoy tenders
Ships of the United States Coast Guard
1965 ships
Ships built in Indiana